Markus Boysen (born 3 September 1954) is a German actor.

Born in Hannover, Markus Boysen is the son of stage actor Rolf Boysen and the brother of director and scenic designer Peer Boysen. He received his acting education from the Hochschule für Musik und Theater in Hamburg. He got his first television part in 1977 in Wolfgang Petersen's legendary Tatort TV movie Reifezeugnis, where he played the victim who was murdered by Nastassja Kinski.

Boysen has mostly worked on the stage, playing, among other places at: Schauspielhaus Bochum, Opern- und Schauspielhaus Frankfurt, Schauspielhaus Düsseldorf, Deutsches Schauspielhaus Hamburg, Deutsches Theater Berlin, Bayerisches Staatsschauspiel München, Burgtheater Wien, Thalia Theater Hamburg and Münchner Kammerspiele. He has also had recurring appearances in television dramas such as Derrick, Der Alte, Kanzleramt and Tatort, as well as feature films, including:

Filmography (selection) 
 1977: Tatort: Reifezeugnis
 1978: Derrick, Season 5, Episode 5: "Steins Tochter"
 1981: Derrick, Season 8, Episode 3: "Kein Garten Eden"
 1986: Die Reise
 1990: Wilhelm Tell
 2003:  (as Helmut Schmidt)
 2004: Die Heilerin
 2005: Mord am Meer
 2005: Speer und Er
 2009: Operation Guardian Angel
 2010: Tatort: Weil sie böse sind
 2010: 
 2012: Lena Fauch und die Tochter des Amokläufers

Radio drama roles

 1986 - Berengar von Arundel in Der Name der Rose (BR/SWR/NDR)
 1981 - Ford Prefect in Per Anhalter ins All (The Hitchhiker's Guide to the Galaxy)  (BR/SWF/WDR)

Honors
2008 Rolf-Mares-Preis for his acting in Blackbird at the Hamburg Kammerspiele

External links

1954 births
Living people
Actors from Hanover
German male stage actors
German male film actors
German male television actors
20th-century German male actors
21st-century German male actors